Roger Webb is an American politician. He served as a Republican member of the Montana Senate, where he represented District 23, including parts of Billings, Montana, in the 2013, 2015, and 2017 sessions.

Personal life 
Webb's wife is Peggy Webb, a politician. They have two daughters. Webb and his family live in Billings, Montana.

References

Living people
Politicians from Billings, Montana
Republican Party Montana state senators
Year of birth missing (living people)
21st-century American politicians